Stacey Tadd (born 21 February 1989 in Bath, Somerset, England) is a British breaststroke swimmer.

Tadd was selected to represent Great Britain at the 2012 Summer Olympics in the 200 m breaststroke.

Stacey's best international results, to the start of London 2012 Summer Olympics, came in the 2003 European Youth Olympic Festival where she won two gold medals and a bronze.

References

External links
British Swimming athlete profile
Profile Swimming.org

Living people
Olympic swimmers of Great Britain
Swimmers at the 2012 Summer Olympics
British female swimmers
1989 births
Female breaststroke swimmers
21st-century British women